Biswajit Mahapatra is an Indian singer from Bhawanipatna, Odisha. He was a participant in Indian Idol Season 10. He has mostly worked as playback singer in Odia film Industry named 'Ollywood'.

Early life
He was born in 1992 in Bhawanipatna, Odisha. He completed his graduation from Utkal University. He was the runner-up in reality singing show 'Voice of Odisha' in 2012.

Career
After Voice of Odisha, he received offers from Odia film Industry. Since 2012 he has contributed in Odia films and released many solo albums. Then he participated in the Indian Idol in 2016.

Indian Idol

Season 9
Before joining this singing reality show, he was already an Odia playback singer. He took part in season 9 in 2016 and sang the popular Odia song 'Phuchuki gali' from film Suna Panjuri.He made into top 40 before getting eliminated.

Season 10
Biswajit participated as a contestant in Indian idol season 10 in 2018, making into Top 14 for 4th round. In 4th round, he had performed a Marathi song "Hi Porgi Konachi" which was well received by the judges of the show. Biswajit got eliminated in 5th round.

Discography

as Playback Singer

Albums

References

External links
 
 on Gaana
 On Hungama
 on Saavn

Indian male singers
Singers from Odisha
Indian Idol participants
People from Bhawanipatna
Living people
Odia playback singers
Year of birth missing (living people)